Channel 61 is a regional television station based in Taupo, New Zealand. The station was launched in December 1996 and is aimed at visitors to the area, broadcasting local tourist information advertorials. 

Channel 61 is operated by Sawyer Television Limited which also runs a news and current affairs bureau in Napier, and makes TV commercials. Sawyer Television Limited also operates TVHB in Hawkes Bay.

External links
 Wellspring TV

English-language television stations in New Zealand 
Mass media in Taupō